The 1993 Skate Canada International was held in Ottawa, Ontario on November 4–7. Medals were awarded in the disciplines of men's singles, ladies' singles, pair skating, and ice dancing.

Results

Men

Ladies

Pairs

Ice dancing

References

Sources
 official protocol

Skate Canada International, 1993
Skate Canada International
1993 in Canadian sports
1993 in Ontario